The Woolsack is the seat of the Lord Speaker in the House of Lords, the Upper House of the Parliament of the United Kingdom. Before 2006, it was the seat of the Lord Chancellor.

History

In the 14th century King Edward III (1327–1377) said that his Lord Chancellor whilst in council should sit on a wool bale, now known as "The Woolsack", in order to symbolise the central nature and great importance of the wool trade to the economy of England in the Middle Ages. Indeed, it was largely to protect the vital English wool trade routes with continental Europe that the Battle of Crécy was fought with the French in 1346.

In 1938, it was discovered that the Woolsack was, in fact, stuffed with horsehair. When it was remade, it was re-stuffed with wool from all over the  British Commonwealth as a symbol of unity.

From the Middle Ages until 2006, the presiding officer in the House of Lords was the Lord Chancellor and the Woolsack was usually mentioned in  association with the office of Lord Chancellor. In July of that year, the function of Lord Speaker was split from that of Lord Chancellor under the Constitutional Reform Act 2005, with the former now sitting on the Woolsack.

Until 1949, Canada's Senate also had a judges' woolsack. At the behest of an MP from Quebec named Jean-François Pioulot who decried the use of a cushion on which the Supreme Court of Canada's judges had to sprawl "like urchins," the woolsack was eventually abolished and replaced with conventional chairs. The original woolsack is still extant.

Ceremonial role

The Woolsack is a large, wool-stuffed cushion covered with red cloth; it has neither a back nor arms, though in the centre of the Woolsack there is a back-rest. The Lords' Mace is placed on the rear part of the Woolsack. The Lord Speaker may speak from the Woolsack when speaking in their capacity as Speaker of the House, but must, if seeking to debate, deliver their remarks either from the left side of the Woolsack, or from the normal seats of the Lords.

If a Deputy Speaker presides in the absence of the Lord Speaker, then that individual uses the Woolsack. However, when the House meets in the "Committee of the Whole", the Woolsack remains unoccupied, and the presiding officer, the Chairman or Deputy Chairman, occupies a chair at the front of the table of the House.

In front of the Woolsack is an even larger cushion known as the Judges' Woolsack. During the State Opening of Parliament, the Judges' Woolsack was historically occupied by the Law Lords. Now the Attorney General, the Solicitor General, the Lord Chief Justice, the Master of the Rolls, the President of the Family Division, the Vice-Chancellor, Justices of the Supreme Court of the United Kingdom, the Lords Justices of Appeal and the Justices of the High Court only attend Parliament for the State Opening.

Mentions in popular culture

Gilbert and Sullivan's comic opera Iolanthe is partially set in the grounds of the Palace of Westminster, the meeting place of the House of Lords, and the Lords appear as the male chorus and a fictional Lord Chancellor is a main character. The entire house, as well as the Lord Chancellor, have become attracted to Phyllis, a ward of chancery. The Lord Chancellor laments that fact that propriety would not allow him to marry his own ward, no matter how strongly he may care for her. He describes his position in this way: "Ah, my Lords, it is indeed painful to have to sit upon a woolsack which is stuffed with such thorns as these!"

In Uncommon Law by A. P. Herbert, the newly-appointed Lady Chancellor finds the Woolsack uncomfortable and orders it to be replaced with a chair. Only after it has been removed does one of her fellow Law Lords mention that when presiding on an appeal, she should not have been sitting on the Woolsack anyway.

Notes

References
 
 
 
 
 The Judges' Woolsack at the UK Parliament site. URL accessed 30 April 2011
 The Interior of the House of Lords at an archived version of the Explore Parliament website. URL accessed 28 February 2011. See also the image at full resolution. The woolsacks are the large, low, rectangular objects in front of the throne, surrounded by ropes. *

External links
 

House of Lords
Irish House of Lords
Senate of Canada
Seats
Upholstery
Wool
Individual pieces of furniture